Terror Keep is a 1927 thriller novel by the British writer Edgar Wallace. It is part of a series featuring Wallace's detective J.G. Reeder.

References

Bibliography
 Russell, James. Great British Fictional Detectives. Remember When, 2009.

External links
 

1927 British novels
British thriller novels
Novels by Edgar Wallace
Doubleday, Page & Company books
Hodder & Stoughton books